Archibald McLean may refer to:

Archibald McLean (d. 1830), New Brunswick political figure
Archibald McLean (Baptist) (1733–1812), Scottish minister
Archibald McLean (judge) (1791–1865), judge and political figure in Upper Canada
Archibald J. McLean (1860–1933), cattleman and politician from Alberta, Canada
Archibald Lang McLean (1885–1922), Australian doctor
Archie McLean (footballer) (1894–1971), football player
Archie McLean (ice hockey) (1889–1960), Canadian professional ice hockey player

See also
Archibald MacLean (1883–1970), officer in the Royal Scots, Royal Flying Corps and Royal Air Force